Kate Seredy (November 10, 1899 – March 7, 1975) was a Hungarian-born writer and illustrator of children's books. She won the Newbery Medal once, the Newbery Honor twice, the Caldecott Honor once, and Lewis Carroll Shelf Award.  Most of her books were written in English, which was not her first language.  Seredy seems to be unknown (and untranslated) in her native Hungary, despite the fact that her story of the Good Master, and the sequel set in World War I are intensely about Hungary.

Life 
Kate Seredy was born November 10, 1899 in Budapest, Hungary. She was the only child of a schoolteacher, Louis Peter Seredy, and his wife, Anna Ireny. Seredy received a diploma to teach art from the Academy of Arts in Budapest. During World War I Seredy traveled to Paris and worked as a combat nurse. After the war she illustrated several books in Hungary.

In 1922 Seredy moved from Budapest to the United States. She studied English language, working as an illustrator and artist to support herself, while preparing to illustrate children's books. From 1933 to 1934 Seredy owned a children's bookstore. Though the store wasn't a success, she later credited it with helping her to understand children and what made a good children's book. In 1935 Seredy met May Massee, the children's editor at Viking Press. Massee didn't have any illustration work for Seredy, but encouraged her to write about her childhood in Hungary, promising to publish the book for Christmas. After several months of work, Seredy submitted what would become The Good Master, which she also illustrated. Though not auto-biographical, Seredy did spend her summers as a child on the plains of Hungary. She used many of her impressions and experiences in the story about young Kate, who is sent by her widowed father from Budapest to the country to live with her Uncle and his family. The Good Master was named a Newbery Honor book in 1935, a runner-up to Caddie Woodlawn, which Seredy illustrated for Simon and Schuster. In addition she designed the jacket and endpapers for Young Walter Scott, which was another Newbery runner-up that year.

In 1936 Seredy wrote and illustrated Listening, set in rural New Jersey. That same year she purchased, "Listening Hill", a one-hundred acre farm near Montgomery, New York. It was here that she wrote The White Stag, an historical retelling of legends of Huns settling Hungary. Seredy learned these stories from her father when she was a child. This book, which she also illustrated, won the Newbery Award in 1938. In 1959 it received the Lewis Carroll Shelf Award.

The Singing Tree appeared in 1939. A sequel to The Good Master, it tells of the effects of World War I on Kate and all of her family. The book shows the terrible effects of war upon ordinary people, especially those who are forced to leave their lands and homes to fight. The Singing Tree was also named a Newbery Honor book. Seredy continued to write and illustrate her own books as well as those of other writers. In 1945 she illustrated The Christmas Anna Angel by Ruth Sawyer. When the Caldecott Honor list was created in 1971, Seredy was retroactively named an Honor winner for those illustrations.

Seredy had twelve children's books published, but she considered herself an illustrator before an author. She had a unique style, primarily based on drawing, and considered her books "an excuse for making pictures". Her last book, Lazy Tinka, is dedicated to her long-time editor, May Massee.

Kate Seredy died March 7, 1975, in Middletown, New York, at the age of 75. Her papers and illustrations are held at the May Massee Collection at Emporia State University, Emporia, Kansas, and the University of Oregon Library.

Works

Written and illustrated 
 The Good Master, Viking Press, 1935 ^
 Listening, Viking, 1936
 The White Stag, Viking, 1937 +
 The Singing Tree, Viking, 1939 ^
 A Tree for Peter, Viking, 1941. Reissued Purple House Press, 2004, 2014.
 The Open Gate, Viking, 1943
 The Chestry Oak, Viking, 1948. Reissued Purple House Press, 2015.
 Gypsy, Viking, 1951
 Philomena, Viking, 1955
 The Tenement Tree, Viking, 1959
 A Brand New Uncle, Viking, 1961
 Lazy Tinka, Viking, 1962

Selected illustrated books 
 Friendly Stories by Arthur I. Gates and Miriam Blanton Huber, Macmillan, 1930
 The Pathfinder : Readings from Modern Literature by Lawton B. Evans, Macmillan, 1930
 God our Father by Virgil George Michel and Basil Augustine Stegmann, Macmillan, 1934
 The Prince Commands by Andre Norton (Norton's debut), D. Appleton–Century Company, 1934
 Caddie Woodlawn by Carol Ryrie Brink, Macmillan, 1935 +
 Common Sense for Mothers on Bringing up Your Children from Babyhood to Adolescence by Estelle Mulqueen Reilly, Funk & Wagnalls, 1935
 Young Walter Scott by Elizabeth Janet Gray, Viking, 1935 ^
 The Selfish Giant and Other Stories compiled by Wilhelmina Harper, David McKay, 1935
 Winterbound by Margery Bianco, Viking, 1936 ^
 Smiling Hill Farm by Miriam Evangeline Mason, Junior Literary Guild and Ginn and Co., 1937
 An Ear for Uncle Emil by E.R. Gaggin, Junior Literary Guild and Viking, 1939
 The Christmas Anna Angel by Ruth Sawyer, Viking, 1943 <
 The Wonderful Year by Nancy Barnes, Junior Literary Guild and J. Messner, 1946 ^
 Little Vic by Doris Gates, Viking, 1951
 A Dog Named Penny by Clyde Robert Bulla, Ginn, 1955

+ Newbery Award Winner
^ Newbery Honor Book
< Caldecott Honor Book

See also

 Attila the Hun in popular culture

Notes

References

External links 
 Guide to the Kate Seredy papers at the University of Oregon
 
 Kate Seredy at Library of Congress Authorities — with 33 catalog records

1899 births
1975 deaths
American children's writers
American children's book illustrators
Hungarian children's book illustrators
Hungarian emigrants to the United States
Newbery Medal winners
Newbery Honor winners
Writers who illustrated their own writing
Writers from Budapest
Hungarian University of Fine Arts alumni
Hungarian women writers
Hungarian women illustrators